Benjamin West (March 28, 1746 – July 29, 1817) was an American lawyer.

Biography
West was born in Tisbury, Massachusetts. In 1768, West graduated from Harvard College; he served briefly as a minister in Wrentham, Massachusetts. West then studied law in New Hampshire. From 1777 to 1779, West worked as a tutor for a planter in Charleston, South Carolina. He then practiced law in Charlestown, New Hampshire. West refused to serve in public office: not in the United States House of Representatives (after the election of 1788-89), nor as New Hampshire Attorney General, or even as probate judge. West also refused membership in the American Antiquarian Society. In 1814, West did serve as a delegate to the Hartford Convention. West died in Charlestown, New Hampshire.

Notes

External links
 

1746 births
1817 deaths
19th-century American lawyers
Harvard College alumni
New Hampshire lawyers
People from Charlestown, New Hampshire
People from Tisbury, Massachusetts